Jade Schaeffer (born 1 July 1986) is a French professional golfer. She played on the Ladies European Tour and won the 2009 Ladies German Open and the 2011 Raiffeisenbank Prague Golf Masters.

Career
Schaeffer had success as an amateur and won the European Ladies Amateur Championship in 2005, which also earned her a start at the 2006 Women's British Open.

She turned professional in 2006 and joined the Ladies European Tour in 2007. In her rookie season, she finished 3rd at the Ladies Open of Portugal and recorded two further top-5 finishes.

In 2009, she won her maiden professional title at the Ladies German Open, prevailing in a playoff over Paula Marti of Spain, and in 2011 she won the Raiffeisenbank Prague Golf Masters. In 2012 she made it into the top-200 on the Women's World Golf Rankings and was runner up at the Sanya Ladies Open in China, two strokes behind her compatriot Cassandra Kirkland. In 2015, she tied for 4th at the Omega Dubai Ladies Masters.

Schaeffer made the cut at the 2009 Women's British Open and qualified for the 2016 U.S. Women's Open through winning the sectional qualifying tournament in Buckinghamshire, England.

Schaeffer also participated in the inaugural season of the LET Access Series in 2010, securing two titles on french soil to finish second in the rankings.

Personal life
Schaeffer is married to European Tour player François Calmels. 

She has an older sister, Fanny, who also is a professional golfer and played on the LET between 2004 and 2007.

Amateur  wins
2005 European Ladies Amateur Championship

Professional wins (4)

Ladies European Tour wins (2)

LET Access Series wins (2)
2010 Dinard Ladies Open, Trophee Preven's

Team appearances
Amateur
European Lady Junior's Team Championship (representing France): 2004
European Ladies' Team Championship (representing France): 2005

References

External links

French female golfers
Ladies European Tour golfers
Sportspeople from Réunion
Golfers from Paris
1986 births
Living people
21st-century French women